Thomas Peck Ochiltree (October 26, 1837November 25, 1902) was a U.S. Representative from Texas.

Biography

Born in Nacogdoches in the Republic of Texas, Ochiltree attended the public schools. He volunteered in 1854 as a private in Capt. John G. Walker's company of Texas Rangers in the campaign against the Apache and Comanche Indians in 1854 and 1855.

He was admitted to the bar by special act of the Texas Legislature in 1857. He served as clerk of the State house of representatives 1856-1859. Secretary of the State Democratic convention in 1859. He was editor of the Jeffersonian in 1860 and 1861. He served as delegate to the Democratic National Conventions at Charleston, South Carolina, and Baltimore, Maryland, in 1860. During the Civil War enlisted in the Confederate States Army in the First Texas Regiment and was promoted successively to lieutenant, captain, and major. He was editor of the Houston Daily Telegraph in 1866–1867. He was appointed commissioner of immigration for Texas in Europe 1870-1873. He was appointed United States marshal for the eastern district of Texas by President Grant January 8, 1874.

Ochiltree was elected as an Independent to the Forty-eighth Congress (March 4, 1883 – March 3, 1885). He moved to New York City and retired. He died in Hot Springs, Virginia, on November 25, 1902. He was interred in Green-Wood Cemetery, Brooklyn, New York. He was reinterred in Mount Hope Cemetery, Hastings-on-Hudson, New York, November 8, 1903.

References

External links
Thomas Peck Ochiltree, Texas State Historical Association

1837 births
1902 deaths
People of Texas in the American Civil War
Members of the United States House of Representatives from Texas
Confederate States Army officers
United States Marshals
Texas Democrats
Texas Independents
Independent members of the United States House of Representatives
People from Nacogdoches, Texas
19th-century American newspaper editors
19th-century American politicians
Journalists from Texas
Military personnel from Texas